A flexible debris-resisting barrier is a structure used to mitigate debris flows or to contain flow-entrained woods.  These structures mainly consist of  interconnected metallic components (cables, posts, shackles...). Flexible debris-resisting barrier are derived from rockfall barriers and were first proposed in the middle of the 1990s in the USA.

In torrents, flexible debris-resisting barrier constitute a sound alternative to check dams for containing debris flows.

The main components of flexible debris-resisting barriers are:

 An interception structure, made up of a principal net with metallic cables, wires, and/or bars and additional layers, usually a finer mesh than the principal.
 A support structure made of metal posts, to support the interception structure.
 Connection components (also called brakes), which dissipate energy from the barrier into the ground and/or foundation.

These barriers are often installed in torrents bed to intercept and contain flow-entrained granular materials or woody debris. In their simplest form,  flexible debris-resisting barriers only consist of an interception structure. When installed in larger channels, the barrier also includes a support structure.

See also 

 Debris flow
 Check dams
Rockfall barrier

References 

Landslide analysis, prevention and mitigation